The Immediate Geographic Region of Águas Formosas is one of the 7 immediate geographic regions in the Intermediate Geographic Region of Teófilo Otoni, one of the 70 immediate geographic regions in the Brazilian state of Minas Gerais and one of the 509 of Brazil, created by the National Institute of Geography and Statistics (IBGE) in 2017.

Municipalities 
It comprises 7 municipalities.

 Águas Formosas     
 Bertópolis   
 Crisólita     
 Fronteira dos Vales   
 Machacalis   
 Santa Helena de Minas     
 Umburatiba

See also 

 List of Intermediate and Immediate Geographic Regions of Minas Gerais

References 

Geography of Minas Gerais